Kabongo Tshimanga (born 22 July 1997) is a professional footballer who plays as a forward for EFL League One club  Peterborough United, on loan from Chesterfield. 

Tshimanga came through the youth ranks at Milton Keynes Dons, later spending time on loan with non-league sides Aldershot Town, Chelmsford City, Corby Town, Nuneaton Town, Chesham United as well as Icelandic side Þróttur and EFL League Two side Yeovil Town. He later had a spell with Boston United before a prolific spell with Oxford City that yielded 24 league goals in 42 games. In 2019 he moved to Boreham Wood where he notched up a further 38 goals in 79 appearances. In 2021 he signed for Chesterfield. Born in the Democratic Republic of the Congo, Tshimanga has previously represented the England C team.

Club career

Milton Keynes Dons

Tshimanga joined Milton Keynes Dons at U10 level. After scoring 27 youth team goals, Tshimanga was rewarded with a squad number early in the 2014–15 season despite only recently turning 18. He made his first team debut on 8 November, coming on as a late substitute for Benik Afobe in a 4–3 FA Cup first round victory over Port Vale at Vale Park. Tshimanga signed his first professional contract with the club on 3 January 2015. On 30 January 2015, Tshimanga joined Aldershot Town of the Conference on loan having scored 42 goals in 25 games for MK Dons U18 team.

Tshimanga spent the entire 2015–16 season on loan to several non-League clubs, including brief spells with Corby Town, Nuneaton Town and Chesham United. On 18 August 2015 he scored an eight-minute hat-trick for Corby Town against Hednesford Town. Following the conclusion of the season, Tshimanga briefly joined Icelandic Úrvalsdeild side Throttur Reykjavik on a short-term loan deal until July 2016.

Tshimanga found more first team opportunities with the Dons during the first half of the 2016–17 season following the club's relegation, and made his first team debut as an 87th-minute substitute on 20 August 2016 away to Rochdale. However, after spending the second half of the season on loan to Yeovil Town, Tshimanga was released from the club in June 2017.

Boston United
Following his release, Tshimanga joined National League North side Boston United on 1 July 2017, signing a one-year deal
before going on to make 34 league appearances and scoring 8 goals.

Oxford City
Following the expiry of his contract, Tshimanga opted to join National League South side Oxford City
in June 2018. On 10 November 2018, Tshimanga scored a hat-trick in an FA Cup first round 3–3 draw away to Tranmere Rovers. Tshimanga ended his first season as top scorer with 29 goals in all competitions, and was also the recipient of the club's Supporters' and Players' Player of the Year awards. He was later named in the 2018–19 National League South Team of the Year.

Boreham Wood
On 1 July 2019, Tshimanga signed for National League club Boreham Wood on a two-year deal. In his first season he helped the club to a play-off finish, scoring 19 goals in 37 appearances in the process.

Chesterfield
On 10 August 2021, despite rumoured interest from Football League sides, Tshimanga joined National League side Chesterfield for an undisclosed fee on a three-year deal. After scoring nine goals in his first six weeks of the season, he was awarded the league's Player of the Month award for August/September 2021. Tshimanga finished the campaign with 25 goals in 31 appearances in all competitions, and was named in the league's Team of the Year for the third consecutive season.

Peterborough United
On 31 January 2023, Tshimanga joined League One side Peterborough United after agreeing a loan deal until the end of the season ahead of a permanent transfer in the summer.

International career
Tshimanga is eligible to play for both England and the Democratic Republic of the Congo. In April 2019, he was called up to the England C squad for a friendly fixture, on 9 April 2019, against a Bedfordshire FA XI to mark the association's 125th anniversary.

Style of play
Speaking in November 2014, then Milton Keynes Dons manager Karl Robinson described Tshimanga as "quick, powerful, he wants to run at people and he's a constant threat."

Career statistics

Honours
Individual
Oxford City Players' Player of the Year: 2018–19
Oxford City Player of the Year: 2018–19
National League South Team of the Year: 2018–19
National League Team of the Year: 2019–20, 2020–21,  2021–22
National League Player of the Month: August/September 2021
Chesterfield Players' Player of the Year: 2021–22
Chesterfield Player of the Year: 2021–22

References

External links

Living people
1996 births
Footballers from Kinshasa
English footballers
England semi-pro international footballers
Democratic Republic of the Congo footballers
Democratic Republic of the Congo emigrants to England
Association football forwards
Milton Keynes Dons F.C. players
Aldershot Town F.C. players
Chelmsford City F.C. players
Corby Town F.C. players
Nuneaton Borough F.C. players
Oxford City F.C. players
Chesham United F.C. players
Kabongo Tshimanga
Yeovil Town F.C. players
Boston United F.C. players
Boreham Wood F.C. players
Chesterfield F.C. players
Peterborough United F.C. players
English Football League players
National League (English football) players
Southern Football League players
Kabongo Tshimanga
English expatriate footballers
Democratic Republic of the Congo expatriate footballers
Expatriate footballers in Iceland